The 2001 Wismilak International was a women's tennis tournament played on outdoor hard courts in Bali, Indonesia that was part of the Tier III category of the 2001 WTA Tour. It was the seventh edition of the tournament and was held from 24 September through 30 September 2001. Unseeded Angelique Widjaja, who played her first WTA tour event and entered on a wildcard, won the singles title and earned $27,000 first-prize money.

Finals

Singles

 Angelique Widjaja defeated  Joannette Kruger, 7–6(7–2), 7–6(7–4)
 It was Widjaja's first singles title of her career.

Doubles

 Evie Dominikovic /  Tamarine Tanasugarn defeated  Janet Lee /  Wynne Prakusya, 6–7(4–7), 6–2, 6–3

References

External links
 ITF tournament edition details
 WTA tournament draws

Wismilak International
Commonwealth Bank Tennis Classic
2001 in Indonesian tennis